Mohebbi may refer to:

Places
Mohebbi, Rudan, Hormozgan Province, Iran

People with the surname
Mohammad Hassan Mohebbi, Iranian wrestler
Afshin Mohebbi, American businessman